Half Bad is a 2014 young adult fantasy novel written by English author Sally Green that won the 2015 Waterstones Teen Book Prize and was shortlisted for the 2015 Branford Boase Award. 

On 3 March 2014, the book set the Guinness World Record as the 'Most Translated Book by a Debut Author, Pre-publication', having sold in 45 languages prior to its UK publication by Penguin books.

Plot 
Half Bad is set in modern-day Europe, mainly in Britain, where witches and humans (fains) live together. There are two primary types of witches: Black (generally oppressed and written off as evil) and White (the main population). The 17-year-old protagonist, Nathan, is half White and half Black, or a Half Code. His mother is dead, and his father, Marcus, is known as the most powerful and the smartest Black Witch in the world. Due to the fact that Nathan is a black witch, he has to go for annual Assessments. His every move is monitored by the Council of White Witches. He needs to follow several rules, but when he breaks one of them, his Gran is deemed unfit to be his guardian, and he receives a new guardian, Celia. Trapped in a cage and abused by Celia, Nathan has to escape before his seventeenth birthday when he will receive three gifts from his father and his magical ability, or Gift. Otherwise, he will die.

After two years, Nathan manages to escape and meets Ellen, a half witch and half fain, or a Half-Blood. Through many contacts, he ends up going to Gabriel in Geneva, who brings him to Mercury, a Black Witch who can perform Nathan's Giving ceremony. Mercury wants the Fairborn, a knife protected by a rotating team of powerful White witches. Rose, Mercury's assistant, Gabriel and Nathan get the Fairborn successfully, but Rose is killed by Hunters while doing so, Gabriel and Nathan run away. Nathan sustains several injuries but heals himself. Unfortunately, Nathan loses the Fairborn and cannot find it. Then, Nathan meets his father, who performs the Giving ceremony. He also removes the Hunter bullet in Nathan, who was shot while escaping. The three gifts Nathan received are his father's ring, the Hunter bullet, and his life. Meanwhile, Nathan meets Annalise, the girl he loves, and due to an unfortunate encounter, she falls into a death-like sleep and only Mercury can awaken her. Nathan begs Mercury to awaken Annalise, but she refuses to do so unless Nathan gives Marcus's head or heart to Mercury. Nathan refuses to kill his father.

In the end, Nathan runs away to find Gabriel.

Story terms
 Hunter: a society or singular of white witches who capture black witches
 Whet: a witch who has not had their gift yet, therefore has no special abilities

Characters 
 Nathan Byrn: The 17-year-old protagonist. He has straight black hair, olive skin and black eyes. He looks like his father. Raised in a family of White Witches he is Black, referred to in the story as (Half Code: B 1.0). He can self-heal extraordinarily fast. 
 Jessica Byrn: Nathan's oldest half-sister who hates him. She later becomes a Hunter.
 Arran Byrn: Nathan's half-brother, with whom Nathan has a loving (brother type) relationship.
 Deborah Byrn: Nathan's half-sister. She (like Arran) loves Nathan.
 Marcus Byrn: Nathan's father, the most feared Black Witch of all time. He killed Nathan's siblings' father, among others. His Gift is transforming into animals but he has also stolen Gifts from many other witches by killing them and eating their hearts.
 Cora Byrn: Nathan's mother, a White Witch who died by suicide. Her gift was healing others.
 Gabriel Boutin: A Black Witch stuck in the body of a fain. He helps Mercury to get Nathan to her in order to get his witch body back and later falls in love with Nathan. Nathan later falls in love with Gabriel, too.
 Annalise O'Brien: A White Witch, some months older than Nathan. She later runs from her cruel family. She and Nathan were in love as young teens, but grow apart by the time they see each other again after Nathan escapes from Celia.
 Soul O'Brien: The uncle of Annalise and a White Witch.
 Mercury: A powerful Black Witch who is supposedly part of all different Witches.
 Rose: A White Witch and Mercury's assistant, who always blushes and giggles.
 Celia: A White Witch, Nathan's mentor who he was sent to live with. She appears to treat Nathan cruelly and even would lock him in a cage. However, near the end of her time with Nathan you begin to see she does care about him and her cruel actions were to prepare him mentally and physically for the hard world ahead.

Development 
Sally Green submitted Half Bad to an agent in January 2013; in March, editorial director Ben Horslen acquired the manuscript for Penguin Books children's imprint Puffin Books, billing it "the book of the Bologna Children's Book Fair" after a 6-figure bidding war. In the run up to its publication in the UK on March 3, 2014, international rights to Half Bad sold rapidly; within 13 weeks of acquisition, it had sold in 25 territories; by November 2013, 36. Upon publication day, it broke the Guinness World Record for 'Most Translated Book by a Debut Author, Pre-publication' with 45 different translations.

Reception 
Even prior to its publication people drew comparisons to The Hunger Games, Harry Potter or the Twilight series. Half Bad has also been compared to Nineteen Eighty-Four by George Orwell. 
Additionally, Half Bad has already broken two Guinness World Records as the most translated book – and the most translated children's book – by a debut author before publication.

A Publishers Weekly starred review states, "This grim and thrilling tale, first in a planned trilogy, features understated prose that lets readers' imaginations fill in the blanks, as well as a well-developed sense of Witch culture. Nathan, the damaged survivor of horrific abuse, is an unforgettable protagonist, and Green expertly captures his torment at being caught between the mutually hostile sides of his heritage." Kirkus Reviews states, "Green propels Nathan forward with the help of often underdeveloped secondary characters, who are overshadowed by the imaginary relationship Nathan builds with his father; it is this that keeps both Nathan and readers going." In a review for Tor.com, Kat Kennedy writes, "Sally Green's Half Bad is the perfect novel for inspiring one to despise all of humanity or fall onto the ground and weep pathetically. Needless to say, it is an excellent book." 

In a review for The Guardian, Philip Womack writes, "While there is nothing new here, Half Bad'''s combination of themes will no doubt be entirely attractive to a large section of readers. Whether it will retain a hold on their imaginations is another matter." In a review for The Telegraph, Martin Chilton writes, "Half Bad doesn't always feel particularly original (scenes are set in mysterious alleys) but it is full of suspense." Half Bad won the 2015 Waterstones Teen Book Prize. It was also shortlisted for the 2015 Branford Boase Award, which seeks to acknowledge outstanding debut novels for children and teenagers; it is an award presented both to the author and editor.

 Sequel Half Wild was released on 24 March 2015. The third and final book in the series, Half Lost, was released in March 2016.

In November 2014 a Companion story, Half Lies was released.

 Adaptations 

A feature film adaptation was announced by Fox 2000 in 2013 with Karen Rosenfelt attached, but went unproduced. Netflix announced a TV adaptation in 2020, to be helmed by Joe Barton, which was released 28 October 2022 as The Bastard Son & The Devil Himself''.

References

External links 
 
 Sally Green's twitter

2014 British novels
Penguin Books books
Contemporary fantasy novels
Young adult fantasy novels
British young adult novels
2014 debut novels
British novels adapted into television shows